Sikukia is a genus of cyprinid fish found in eastern Asia.  There are currently four recognized species in this genus.

Its genus name Sikukia, that refers to Khlong Sikuk, also known as Khwae Sikuk (แควสีกุก; lit: Sikuk Canal), another name of Noi River was called in Chainat Province (including some areas in Ayutthaya Province), central Thailand. It was first discovered on November 26, 1931 by H. M. Smith.

Species
 Sikukia flavicaudata X. L. Chu & Y. R. Chen, 1987
 Sikukia gudgeri (H. M. Smith, 1934)
 Sikukia longibarbata Z. Y. Li, Y. R. Chen, J. X. Yang & X. Y. Chen, 1998
 Sikukia stejnegeri H. M. Smith, 1931

References
 
 

Cyprinidae genera
Cyprinid fish of Asia

zh:鲤科#短吻魚屬（Sikukia）